The Assembled Parties is a play written by Richard Greenberg. It relates the story of a Jewish family living on the Upper West Side of New York City over a twenty-year period, from 1980 to 2000. The play, which premiered on Broadway in 2013, received three Tony Award nominations, including for Best Play.

Production
The play opened on Broadway at the Samuel J. Friedman Theatre in a Manhattan Theatre Club production on April 17, 2013 after previews from March 21, 2013. Directed by Lynne Meadow the play features Judith Light as Faye, Jessica Hecht as Julie, Jonathan Walker as Ben and Mark Blum as Mort. The sets are by Santo Loquasto and costumes by Jane Greenwood.

The play, a limited run, had extended for a second time to July 7, 2013, and then for a final time, to July 28, 2013. When the play closed on July 28, it had run for 119 performances and 28 previews.

Synopsis
In 1980, the Bascov family gets together to celebrate Christmas. They are Jewish but do not observe their religion. They gather at the large and luxurious Upper West Side (New York) apartment of Julie, a former teen movie star and her wealthy husband Ben. Also present are their sons Scotty, recently graduated from college and young Timmy, sick with the flu. Ben's sister Faye, her husband Mort and their daughter, Shelley, arrive. Jeff, a school friend of Scotty, is a visitor.

20 years later, in 2000, the family meets again at Christmas at Julie's apartment. However, now Ben, Mort, and Scotty are dead, and Shelley is estranged. Those present are Julie, who has a fatal illness; Faye, now no longer taking medications; and Jeff, returned from a successful law job in Chicago. Tim (no longer Timmy) comes and goes; he has been forced to leave college and works at a restaurant.

Critical response
Ben Brantley, in his review in The New York Times, called the play "charming", writing " It is also smart, sad and so impossibly well-spoken you may feel like giving up on conversation.... is an elegy to a breed of woman, a style of living and a genre of theater of which only vestiges remain in frantic, self-promoting New York." The USA Today reviewer called the play "endearing", writing "By the time Act Two unfolds -- 20 years later, in the same apartment -- we have learned that these folks are all vulnerable to bad choices, the whims of fortune and the simple passing of time."

The play received three Tony Award nominations: Best Play, Best Performance by an Actress in a Featured Role in a Play (Judith Light) and Best Scenic Design of a Play (Santo Loquasto). The play received Drama Desk Award nominations for Outstanding Play, Outstanding Featured Actress in a Play (Judith Light), Outstanding Director of a Play, and Outstanding Set Design.

Awards and nominations
The production was recognized with Drama League Award nominations for Outstanding Production of a Broadway or Off-Broadway Play and with two Distinguished Performance Award nominations but did not win. The production received one Outer Critics Circle Award nomination. The play earned four 58th Drama Desk Award nominations and one win for Judith Light as Outstanding Featured Actress in a Play. The play received three Tony Awards nominations for the 67th Tony Awards, again winning Featured Actress in a Play.

Original Broadway production

References

External links
Listing, Internet Broadway Database
Manhattan Theatre Club Official Site

2013 plays
Plays by Richard Greenberg
Broadway plays
Fiction set in 1980
Fiction set in 2000
Plays set in New York City